Calliostoma axelolssoni, common name Olsson's top shell, is a species of sea snail, a marine gastropod mollusk in the family Calliostomatidae.

Description
The size of the shell varies between 20 mm and 33 mm.

Distribution
This marine species occurs off the Lesser Antilles and Northern Brazil at a depth of 230 m.

References

 Bayer, F. M. 1971. Biological results of the University of Miami Deep-Sea Expeditions. 79. New and unusual mollusks collected by R/V John Elliott Pillsbury and R/V Gerda in the tropical Western Atlantic. Bulletin of Marine Science 21: 111–236.
 Quinn, J. F. Jr. 1992. New species of Calliostoma Swainson, 1840 (Gastropoda: Trochidae), and notes on some poorly known species from the Western Atlantic Ocean. Nautilus 106: 77-114

External links
 To Biodiversity Heritage Library (1 publication)
 To Encyclopedia of Life
 To World Register of Marine Species
 

axelolssoni
Gastropods described in 1992